Praia das Conchas is a settlement in the western part of the Lobata District on São Tomé Island in São Tomé and Príncipe. Its population is 174 (2012 census). Established as a plantation (roça), Praia das Conchas lies 2 km from the coast, 3 km west of Guadalupe. There is a smaller seaside settlement also called Praia das Conchas, 3.5 km to the north.

Population history

References

Populated places in Lobata District